Nílton Ferreira Júnior (born 21 April 1987 in Barra do Garças), simply known as Nílton, is a Brazilian footballer who plays as a defensive midfielder.

Nílton has also been capped for Brazil at Under-20 level.

Career statistics

Club career
Updated to 23 February 2017.

In May 2019, he joined CSA.

Honours

Club
Corinthians
 Campeonato Brasileiro Série A: 2005
 Campeonato Brasileiro Série B: 2008

Vasco da Gama
 Campeonato Brasileiro Série B: 2009
 Copa do Brasil: 2011

Cruzeiro
 Campeonato Brasileiro Série A: 2013, 2014
 Campeonato Mineiro: 2014

International
 Campeonato Gaúcho: 2015

Bahia
 Campeonato Baiano: 2018, 2019

Individual
 Campeonato Brasileiro Série A Team of the Year: 2013

References

External links

Profile at Vissel Kobe

1987 births
Living people
Brazilian footballers
Association football midfielders
Campeonato Brasileiro Série A players
Campeonato Brasileiro Série B players
Sport Club Corinthians Paulista players
Clube Atlético Bragantino players
CR Vasco da Gama players
Cruzeiro Esporte Clube players
Sport Club Internacional players
Esporte Clube Bahia players
Centro Sportivo Alagoano players
J1 League players
Vissel Kobe players
Brazilian expatriate footballers
Brazilian expatriate sportspeople in Japan
Expatriate footballers in Japan